Rajan Shah railway station is located in Tehsil Karor Lal Esan, District Layyah, Punjab, Pakistan.

See also
 List of railway stations in Pakistan
 Pakistan Railways

References

External links

Railway stations in Layyah District
Railway stations on Kotri–Attock Railway Line (ML 2)